Gale Adcock (born January 25, 1954) is a family nurse practitioner and American politician who has served in the North Carolina Senate representing the 16th district (including constituents in Wake County) since 2023. Adcock previously served in the North Carolina House of Representatives representing the 41st district (including constituents in Wake County) from 2015 to 2023. She also served as Deputy House Minority leader for one term.

Life and career
Adcock was raised in southwestern Virginia. She earned an undergraduate degree in nursing from East Carolina University and a master's of science in nursing from the University of North Carolina at Chapel Hill. She has been a nurse practitioner since 1987 and was Chief Health Officer at SAS Institute before retiring in October 2020. She was elected to the North Carolina House in 2014. She lives in Cary, North Carolina. She previously served on the Cary City Council from 2007 to 2014.

Adcock has served as president of the North Carolina Nurses Association, chair of the North Carolina Center for Nursing, and as a 2-term member of the North Carolina Board of Nursing. She is a Fellow of the American Association of Nurse Practitioners and a Fellow of the American Academy of Nursing. She has received numerous awards and honors, including the Barbara Thoman Curtis Award for political activism from the American Nurses Association in 2018.

Electoral history

2022

2020

2018

2016

2014

Committee assignments

2021-2022 session
Appropriations
Appropriations - Health and Human Services 
Health
Commerce 
Regulatory Reform 
Rules, Calendar, and Operations of the House

2019-2020 session
Health 
Education - Universities 
Commerce 
Finance 
Regulatory Reform 
Rules, Calendar, and Operations of the House

2017-2018 session
Appropriations
Appropriations - General Government
Appropriations - Information Technology
Homeland Security, Military, and Veterans Affairs
Wildlife Resources
Health

2015-2016 session
Appropriations
Appropriations - General Government
Homeland Security, Military, and Veterans Affairs
Wildlife Resources

References

|-

|-

1954 births
Living people
Democratic Party North Carolina state senators
Democratic Party members of the North Carolina House of Representatives
East Carolina University alumni
University of North Carolina at Chapel Hill alumni
People from Cary, North Carolina
Nurses from Virginia
UNC School of Nursing alumni
21st-century American politicians
21st-century American women politicians
North Carolina city council members
Women city councillors in North Carolina
Fellows of the American Academy of Nursing